The 2005 Qatar Ladies Open (known as the 2005 Qatar Total Open for sponsorship reasons), was a tennis tournament played on outdoor hard courts. It was the 5th edition of the Qatar Total Open, and was part of the Tier II Series of the 2005 WTA Tour. It took place at the Khalifa International Tennis Complex in Doha, Qatar, in February 2005.

Points and prize money

Point distribution

Prize money

1 Points per the WTA.
2 Qualifiers prize money is also the Round of 32 prize money
* per team

Finals

Singles

 Maria Sharapova defeated  Alicia Molik, 4–6, 6–1, 6–4

Doubles

 Alicia Molik /  Francesca Schiavone defeated  Cara Black /  Liezel Huber, 6–3, 6–4

External links
 Official Results Archive (ITF)
 2005 Doha & Acapulco WTA Singles Results     Maria Sharapova & Flavia Pennetta, Champions

Qatar Ladies Open
Qatar Ladies Open
2005 in Qatari sport